South of Suva is a 1922 American silent drama film starring Mary Miles Minter and directed by Frank Urson. It was adapted by Fred Myton from a story by Ewart Adamson. As with many of Minter's features, it is thought to be a lost film.

Plot

As described in various film magazine reviews, Phyllis Latimer (Minter) is sailing to Suva in the Fiji Islands to join her husband Sydney (Long), whom she has not seen since their marriage three years previously. She is travelling with Pauline Leonard (Bryson), who is to meet with her ward John Webster (Bowers) on Suva, but Pauline instead chooses to accompany a man she has fallen in love with on board.

When Phyllis arrives at her husband's plantation, she finds that Sydney has degenerated into a brutal drunk and surrounded himself with native women. Phyllis gives him two weeks to reform himself, and when he fails to do so and she tries to leave, he attacks her. When Sydney is knocked unconscious by a falling canopy Phyllis flees, but she does not have the money to pay for her return passage.

Phyllis seeks refuge with John Webster, and uses her knowledge of Pauline from the voyage to successfully pose as his ward. A romance begins to develop between them, but when Webster is away, Sydney arrives at his house. He reveals Phyllis' true identity to Webster's assistant, and drags her back to his own plantation.

When Phyllis refuses to submit to her husband, Sydney hands her over to the natives to be a human sacrifice. Webster arrives just in time to save her, and in the ensuing conflict Sydney is killed. Once it has been made clear to him that she is not his ward, Phyllis and Webster are free to wed.

Cast
Mary Miles Minter as Phyllis Latimer
Winifred Bryson as Pauline Leonard
Walter Long as Sydney Latimer
John Bowers as John Webster
Roy Atwell as Marmaduke Grubb
Fred Kelsey as Karl Swartz
Larry Steers as Alfred Bowman (credited as Lawrence Steers)
Benny Ayers as Native (uncredited)
Bhogwan Singh as Native (uncredited)

References

External links

Southseascinema.org (S-Z) page

1922 films
American silent feature films
Lost American films
1922 romantic drama films
American romantic drama films
American black-and-white films
Films directed by Frank Urson
1920s American films
Silent romantic drama films
Silent American drama films